Proma Tagore is a Canadian poet and editor, who was awarded an Honour of Distinction from the Dayne Ogilvie Prize for LGBT writers in 2014.

Born in Kolkata, India, Tagore emigrated to Canada with her family at the age of four. She resides in Victoria and Vancouver, British Columbia.

She has published a poetry collection, language is not the only thing that breaks, and a non-fiction work of literary analysis, The Shapes of Silence: Writing by Women of Colour and the Politics of Testimony. She was also editor of In Our Own Voices: Learning and Teaching Toward Decolonisation, an anthology of essays by students and educators on the subject of racial discrimination and decolonization.

Works
In Our Own Voices: Learning and Teaching Toward Decolonisation (Larkuma Press, 2006. )
The Shapes of Silence: Writing by Women of Colour and the Politics of Testimony (McGill-Queen's University Press, 2009. )
language is not the only thing that breaks (Arsenal Pulp Press, 2011. )

References

Canadian women poets
21st-century Canadian poets
Canadian editors
Canadian women editors
Canadian literary critics
Women literary critics
Living people
Indian emigrants to Canada
Canadian LGBT poets
Canadian writers of Asian descent
People from Kolkata
Writers from Vancouver
21st-century Canadian women writers
Canadian women non-fiction writers
Year of birth missing (living people)
21st-century Canadian LGBT people